Thomas Bryan VC (21 January 1882 – 13 October 1945) was an English recipient of the Victoria Cross, the highest and most prestigious award for gallantry in the face of the enemy that can be awarded to British and Commonwealth forces.

Early life

Byran was born in Worcestershire, but grew up in Castleford, West Riding of Yorkshire, England. He moved as a toddler with his family who headed north to find work in the Yorkshire collieries. His father worked as a miner at the Whitwood Colliery. Byran followed his father into the mines working at Askern Colliery.

VC action
Bryan was 35 years old, and a lance-corporal in the 25th (Service) Battalion (2nd Tyneside Irish), Northumberland Fusiliers, British Army during the First World War at the Battle of Arras when the following deed took place for which he was awarded the VC.

On 9 April 1917 near Arras, France, during an attack Lance-Corporal Bryan although wounded, went forward alone in order to silence a machine-gun which was inflicting much damage. He worked his way along the communication trench, approached the gun from behind, disabled it and killed two of the team. The results obtained by Lance-Corporal Bryan's action were very far-reaching.

Rugby league
Bryan played rugby league for Castleford RFC (unrelated to the Castleford Tigers) in the 1906–07 season, at the end of which the club withdrew from the Northern Union for financial reasons.

His VC is on display in the Lord Ashcroft Gallery at the Imperial War Museum, London. His grave is maintained by the Victoria Cross Trust

References

Monuments to Courage (David Harvey, 1999)
The Register of the Victoria Cross (This England, 1997)
VCs of the First World War: Arras and Messines 1917 (Sutton, 1998)

External links
(archived by web.archive.org) Castleford info
(archived by web.archive.org) Stourbridge-born VC hero
(archived by web.archive.org) Location of grave and VC medal (South Yorkshire)
(archived by web.archive.org) VC medal auction details

1882 births
1945 deaths
Burials in South Yorkshire
British Army personnel of World War I
British Army recipients of the Victoria Cross
British World War I recipients of the Victoria Cross
Castleford RFC players
English rugby league players
People from Stourbridge
Royal Northumberland Fusiliers soldiers
Rugby league players from Worcestershire
Military personnel from Worcestershire